Bill C-11 is any of several articles of legislation introduced into the House of Commons of Canada, including:
 Immigration and Refugee Protection Act, introduced in 2001 to the first session of the 37th Parliament
 Copyright Modernization Act, introduced in 2011 to the first session of the 41st Parliament
 Online Streaming Act, introduced in 2022 to the first session of the 44th Parliament

Canadian federal legislation